The Waterloo Medal was a medal given to  British Army members who served on the Battle of Waterloo.

The Waterloo Medal may also refer to:

Waterloo Medal (Brunswick), given by the Duchy of Brunswick
Waterloo Medal (Nassau), given by the Duchy of Nassau
Waterloo Medal (Pistrucci), designed by Benedetto Pistrucci